The Hohe Brücke (High Bridge) is a bridge across the Tiefer Graben (Deep Ditch) in Innere Stadt, Vienna, Austria. It links the two parts of Wipplingerstraße, which used to be separated by a brook.

For a long time there has been a lottery next to the bridge, and many people in Vienna remember their old advertising slogan, Über die Hohe Brücke führt der Weg zum Glücke ("Across the High Bridge leads the path to luck").

The current bridge was designed by Josef Hackhofer and built in 1903–04.

References
 AEIOU | Hohe Brücke

Bridges in Austria
Bridges completed in 1904
Art Nouveau architecture in Vienna
Art Nouveau bridges
1904 establishments in Austria
20th-century architecture in Austria